The Bayer designations f Velorum and F Velorum are distinct. Due to technical limitations, both designations link here. For the star
f Velorum, see KX Velorum (HD 75821)
F Velorum, see GU Velorum (HD 71935)

Velorum, f
Vela (constellation)